Dipropus simplex is a species of click beetle in the family Elateridae, found in the southern United States and Mexico.

References

Elaterinae
Beetles of North America
Beetles described in 1853
Taxa named by John Lawrence LeConte